Marcus L. Bell (born June 1, 1979 in Memphis, Tennessee) is a former American football defensive lineman. He has previously played for the Arizona Cardinals, the Detroit Lions, and the New York Giants.

College career
Bell played college football at the University of Memphis whose presence in the starting lineup brought an instant improvement for the defensive unit despite starting just 20 games. He finished career with 34 tackles behind the line of scrimmage and 10 sacks at nose guard. 209 total tackles in 42 games as a Tiger. Was anchor of the nation's top-rated rushing defense as a senior in 2000. He was one of five Tiger defenders to earn first-team all-Conference USA honors, tying league record. Natural hunter finishing fifth on the team with 60 total tackles (47 solos) also recorded four sacks for –36 yards and a team-high 16 stops for losses of 61 yards, 16 tackles behind the line of scrimmage rank fifth on the Memphis single-season list.

Professional career
Bell was drafted by the Arizona Cardinals in the 2001 NFL Draft, and played for the Cardinals during the 2001, 2002, 2003 and 2004 seasons. He was released by the Detroit Lions on March 2, 2007. On April 13, 2007, he signed with the Giants, but was placed on injured reserve on August 28.

In 2009 Marcus joined the Memphis Tiger Athletic staff, as a member of the strength and conditioning program.

References

American football defensive tackles
1979 births
Living people
Arizona Cardinals players
Memphis Tigers football players
Detroit Lions players
New York Giants players